Clayton Watson (born 23 March 1977) is an Australian producer, actor, writer, and director. He grew up in the Australian outback on a sheep station close to Morgan, a small town in South Australia. He is best known for his breakthrough role as Kid in the films of The Matrix.

Career
Watson broke through playing the role of Kid next to Keanu Reeves, Laurence Fishburne, and Carrie-Anne Moss in The Matrix Reloaded, The Matrix Revolutions, and the short film "Kid's Story" in The Animatrix. He reprised his role for The Matrix Online, and was nominated for Best Newcomer at the American Sci-Fi Awards. He won an AFI for his role in Always Greener.

Watson appeared in the lead role of David in Stephen King's Willa, and worked alongside Guy Pearce in the 2011 feature 33 Postcards, and was a voice in the film Oranges and Sunshine with Hugo Weaving, Emily Watson, and David Wenham. He played Mick Barrow in the 2012 feature Shadows from the Sky alongside Sean Bean, Manu Bennett and John Rhys-Davies, and received rave reviews from his work in London on the psychological horror Credo (also known as The Devil's Curse in the United States), playing an American jock alongside Colin Salmon, MyAnna Buring, and the late Stephen Gately.

Other feature titles include Under the Radar, The Crossing, Bonnie & Clydo, In the Middle, Gargantua, Three Blind Mice, and Drawn Together. Well known in television for his AFI-winning performance as lead character 'Mickey Steele' in Channel 7's Emmy award-winning show Always Greener, Blue Heelers, Day of the Roses, and his lead part of Jarrod O'Donnell in BBC's Out of the Blue. He also signed on for a small guest role on Home and Away as Grant Bledcoe, Ruby Buckton's (Rebecca Breeds) biological father with a sordid past. He next appeared on Channel 9's Sea Patrol, and wrote, produced, and directed the feature Deadly Flat starring Renai Caruso and himself.

I Wish I Were Stephanie V premiered at the Women of the World Film Festival in Sydney this year, and played to a standing ovation in Times Square. Clayton plays the romantic lead, Jimmy Koutella. Clayton is represented by The Glick Agency and Wishlab in the U.S., and Sue Barnett and Associates in Australia.

In November 2013, Watson began appearing as Jacob Holmes in Neighbours then directed his first feature in New York about PTSD playing the lead character title role Michael Wardeath.

Awards
Australian Film Institute Television Awards
2002 Winner Best Actor in a Supporting or Guest Role in a Television Drama - Always Greener (Seven Network)

External links

References

1977 births
AACTA Award winners
Australian male film actors
Australian male television actors
Australian male voice actors
Australian expatriates in England
Living people
People educated at Pembroke School, Adelaide